Zuzana Tvarůžková (born 26 June 1983 in Litvínov) is a Czech television presenter, who works for television channel Česká televize (ČT). She started presenting the programme Interview ČT24 in 2014, together with colleague .

In September–October 2014, together with colleague , she moderated the pre-election debates of ČT before the 2014 municipal elections.

Personal life
Tvarůžková was born in Litvínov and her parents are Czechs. However, her biological father is a Cuban who worked in a Litvínov chemical plant. Shortly after Tvarůžková's mother became pregnant with him, he had to return to Havana. She was raised by her mother and her husband Ladislav Tvarůžek. She contacted her biological father only in adulthood via the social network Facebook.

Tvarůžková has two siblings, older sister Lucie and younger brother Ladislav.

References

1983 births
Living people
People from Litvínov
Czech people of Cuban descent
Czech television presenters
Czech women television presenters